Honey's Money is a 1962 Merrie Melodies animated short featuring Yosemite Sam. The short was released on September 1, 1962.

Honey's Money is a remake of the 1950s shorts His Bitter Half and Hare Trimmed.  In His Bitter Half, Daffy marries a female duck for her money, but is thrown for a loop when his wife immediately becomes a nag and forces him to do housework and spend quality time with a son she did not previously reveal. The same basic situation appears in Honey's Money, with Yosemite Sam in Daffy's place and some alternate gags.  Additionally, the different personality and character design of son Wentworth—now an innocent, dim-witted, hulking child rather than a little brat—results in a different execution of the premise. Some features from Hare Trimmed are also included, but not the meddling of that short's rival, Bugs Bunny.

Plot
Sam learns that a local widow has inherited $5 million and plans to marry her, after which he plans to buy the old ladies' home and kick the old ladies out, close the orphanage and get rid of the police department (just like he tried to do in Hare Trimmed). When Sam finds out that the woman is ugly, he changes his mind, but he agrees to marry her when she says she now has someone to help her spend her money. After the wedding, Sam discovers she is a shrewish harridan when she shows her true colors. Sam is quickly turned into a maid, forced to do backbreaking house chores while the wife sits idly by, watching his every move.

It is at this point where the woman calls her enormous, yet still childlike son, Wentworth, to meet his new stepfather. Sam objects when he is asked to play horsie with his new stepson, but agrees when he is shown her bank book.  During the horse ride, Sam gets squashed by the enormous child riding on his back. Sam and his wife get into a huge shouting match a short time later when she asks him to take Wentworth to the park, leading Wentworth to make the innocent (yet obvious) observation, "My mommy and daddy are fighting." At the park, Sam decides that in order to keep all the money for himself, he has to get rid of Wentworth. He first tries to throw a ball into the street but his wife catches on to what he is up to and makes him retrieve it, causing Sam to get run over (his wife is never seen again after that). When he later takes Wentworth swimming, Sam hires a passing truck from an alligator farm loaded with alligators and herds all of the alligators into the pool while Wentworth is changing, but when Wentworth exclaims, "Here I come!", when he jumps into the pool he makes such a huge splash that all of the alligators land back in the truck on top of Sam. A lot of splashing, growling, and jaw-snapping is heard as he tries to beat them off with a club.

In the closing scene, Sam has packed his bags and is leaving the house muttering, "It's just money. Is it worth it? What's a million bucks?" He then realizes his life of torture is worth all that money and goes running back to the old woman's home.

Notes
The cartoon is unique in that, with the exception of 1947's Along Came Daffy, it is the only time in the original theatrical cartoons that Sam is not paired with long-time rival Bugs Bunny. This is Sam's first cartoon that only he stars in.

The same premise would be used again in a 1970 Roland and Rattfink short, A Taste of Money.

Milt Franklyn provided the music for the short, though he had been deceased since April 1962. This means the short was completed before his death. This would be the case with two more shorts in late 1962, before replacement composer William Lava's name finally started appearing in the opening credits in November with Good Noose.

Reception
Animation historian David Gerstein writes, "Desperate to make married life endurable under the circumstances, Yosemite is driven to some of the darkest plots ever seen in a Looney Tune — efforts to murder his young stepson via alligators and speeding cars. Only Sam's sheer bombast and exaggerated evil make the material funny rather than tragic. Freleng takes an admirably successful risk. Sam's own risks aren't as successful... for him."

Music
 The Gold Diggers' Song (We're in the Money), c. 1933, lyrics Al Dubin, music by Harry Warren
 Ain't We Got Fun, 1921, Richard A. Whiting

Home media
This cartoon has been released on Blu-ray and DVD on the 2014 Looney Tunes Platinum Collection Vol. 3.

See also
 List of Yosemite Sam cartoons

References

External links
 
 

1962 animated films
1962 short films
1960s Warner Bros. animated short films
Merrie Melodies short films
Films scored by Milt Franklyn
Yosemite Sam films
Short films directed by Friz Freleng
1960s English-language films
1960s American films
Remakes of American films
Animated film remakes
Films about inheritances
Films about marriage